Mercendarbe Manor, also called Mencendorf Manor and Mencendarbe Manor is a manor house in the historical region of Zemgale, in Latvia.

History 
Originally estate was owned by Peter von Biron (1724-1800), the last Duke of Courland. On 11th of August, 1786, along with the associated land estates and lakes,  manor was sold to  Baron Friedrich Georg  von Lieven (1748-1800) for 31,000 thalers. Baron von Lieven liked to use the castle as summer residence and hunting lodge, for example for duck hunting. After his death, his son Karl Georg von Lieven managed the estate. In 1905 Freiherr Alexander von Lieven was named as the owner.  Kurland Society for Literature and Art:  Jahrbuch für Genealogie, Heraldik und Sphragistik , 1905, p. 235, No. 143  The last owner was Carlos von Lieven (1879-1971). Until World War I, the estate remained in the possession of the Lieven family.

From 1920 to 1939, the owners of the manor changed regularly. In 1939 a children's home was opened on the estate, it was only closed in 2012. Currently, the mansion is a hotel, in which many different events such as concerts, wedding, seminars or even the Latvia hackathon take place.

See also
List of palaces and manor houses in Latvia

References

External links 
 Mercendarbe manor
  Mercendarbe Manor
 

Manor houses in Latvia